A cistron is an alternative term for "gene". The word cistron is used to emphasize that genes exhibit a specific behavior in a cis-trans test; distinct positions (or loci) within a genome are cistronic.

History 
The words cistron and gene were coined before the advancing state of biology made it clear that the concepts they refer to are practically equivalent. The same historical naming practices are responsible for many of the synonyms in the life sciences.

The term cistron was coined by Seymour Benzer in an article entitled The elementary units of heredity. The cistron was defined by an operational test applicable to most organisms that is sometimes referred to as a cis-trans test, but more often as a complementation test.

Definition 
For example, suppose a mutation at a chromosome position  is responsible for a change in recessive trait in a diploid organism (where chromosomes come in pairs). We say that the mutation is recessive because the organism will exhibit the wild type phenotype (ordinary trait) unless both chromosomes of a pair have the mutation (homozygous mutation). Similarly, suppose a mutation at another position, is responsible for the same recessive trait. When instead the wild type trait is expressed, the positions are said to belong to distinct cistrons / genes. Or simply put, mutations on the same cistrons will not complement; as opposed to mutations on different cistrons may complement (see Benzer's T4 bacteriophage experiments T4 rII system).

For example, an operon is a stretch of DNA that is transcribed to create a contiguous segment of RNA, but contains more than one cistron / gene. The operon is said to be polycistronic, whereas ordinary genes are said to be monocistronic.

References

Genes